One Direction: Where We Are – The Concert Film, also known as One Direction: Where We Are – Live from San Siro Stadium is the second concert film by English-Irish boy band One Direction and the sequel to One Direction: This Is Us. The film takes place during the 28 and 29 June 2014 shows of the band's Where We Are Tour at San Siro Stadium in Milan, Italy. It contains a 15-minute interview with the band and behind-the-scenes footage.

Background
Initial rumours of a sequel to This Is Us surfaced in April 2014 as Horan, Malik, and Tomlinson were seen being followed by a camera crew during their visit to the Christ the Redeemer in Rio de Janeiro, Brazil; meanwhile Payne and Styles were also followed by a camera crew during their visit to Machu Picchu in the Cusco Region of Peru. On 20 May 2014, the band announced the concert film on their official website with filming taking place by the end of June 2014 during their Where We Are Tour in San Siro Stadium in Milan, to be released on home media in December 2014.

Promotion
On 22 July 2014, the first teaser trailer was posted on the band's YouTube channel announcing the worldwide limited theatrical release for 11 and 12 October 2014 only.

Release
The film was released worldwide on 11 October 2014 and ended showings the next day. The film broke the record for the highest grossing event cinema production with a net total of $4.8 million.

Set list
 "Midnight Memories"
 "Little Black Dress"
 "Kiss You" 
 "Why Don't We Go There"
 "Rock Me" 
 "Don't Forget Where You Belong"
 "Live While We're Young"
 "C'Mon, C'Mon"  
 "Right Now"
 "Through The Dark"
 "Happily"
 "Little Things"
 "Moments" (Only in DVD)
 "Strong" (Only in DVD)
 "Better Than Words" (Only in DVD)
 "Alive"
 "One Thing"
 "Diana"
 "What Makes You Beautiful"

Encore

 "You & I"
 "Story of My Life"
 "Little White Lies" 
 "Best Song Ever"

Notes
Only in DVD

Certifications

References

2014 films
One Direction
Concert films
2010s English-language films